Daviesia microcarpa, commonly known as Norseman pea, is a species of flowering plant in the family Fabaceae and is endemic to two small areas of inland Western Australia. It is a sprawling shrub with tangled stems and crowded, needle-shaped, sharply-pointed phyllodes, and orange and pinkish-red flowers.

Description

Taxonomy and naming
Daviesia microcarpa was first formally described in 1995 by Michael Crisp in Australian Systematic Botany from specimens collected near  Norseman in 1979. The specific epithet (microcarpa) means "small-fruited", referring to the phyllodes.

Distribution and habitat
This daviesia grows in sandy soil in woodland and is known from two disjunct populations, near Norseman where 13 plants were recorded in March 2010, and Southern Cross where there were 39 plants, in the Coolgardie biogeographic region of inland Western Australia.

Conservation status
Daviesia microcarpa is listed as "endangered" under the Australian Government Environment Protection and Biodiversity Conservation Act 1999 and as "Threatened Flora (Declared Rare Flora — Extant)" by the Department of Biodiversity, Conservation and Attractions and a recovery plan has been prepared. The main threats to the species include its short life span and limited numbers of young plants, change in hydrology as a result of road works, and inappropriate fire regimes. Translocations have been conducted near Norseman with some plants setting seed, but in 2008 all the translocated plants were destroyed by vandals.

References

microcarpa
Eudicots of Western Australia
Plants described in 1995
Taxa named by Michael Crisp